Now Ain't the Time for Your Tears is the debut solo album by English singer-songwriter and Transvision Vamp vocalist Wendy James, released on 8 March 1993 by MCA Records.

Background
The album was conceived after Wendy James had a chance meeting with Pete Thomas, drummer for Elvis Costello and the Attractions, during Transvision Vamp's final tour. After asking Thomas if Costello might be able to help her with a possible solo career, Thomas suggested she contact him. The album was then written in its entirety, in one weekend, by Costello, with several tracks co-written by his then-wife, Cait O'Riordan.

The album's title comes from a line in the chorus of Bob Dylan's song "The Lonesome Death of Hattie Carroll".

Reception
Now Ain't the Time for Your Tears was relatively unsuccessful, only peaking at No. 43 on the UK Albums Chart. The singles released from the album also met with moderate to minor success, with "The Nameless One" and "London's Brilliant" peaking at Nos. 34 and 62, respectively. In 1994, Costello's demos for "Puppet Girl", "Basement Kiss" and "We Despise You" were released on his "13 Steps Lead Down" EP.

Track listing
All songs by Elvis Costello, except where noted.

 "This Is a Test" – 1:58
 "London's Brilliant" (Costello, Cait O'Riordan) – 2:29
 "Basement Kiss" (Costello, O'Riordan) – 4:03
 "Puppet Girl" (Costello, O'Riordan) – 2:48
 "Earthbound" (Costello, O'Riordan) – 4:32
 "Do You Know What I'm Saying?" – 5:16
 "We Despise You" (Costello, O'Riordan) – 3:21
 "Fill in the Blanks" – 3:14
 "The Nameless One" – 5:30
 "I Want to Stand Forever" – 4:31

Personnel
 Wendy James – lead vocals

Additional musicians
 Pete Thomas – drums, percussion; backing vocals (track 8)
 Richard "Cass" Lewis – bass guitar; backing vocals (track 8)
 Neil Taylor – guitars; backing vocals (track 8)
 Andy Bown – organ
 Jon Astley – piano
 Ian Wilson – backing vocals
 Steve Butler – backing vocals
 Jeff Young – backing vocals (track 8)
 Chris Kimsey – backing vocals (track 8)

Technical
 Chris Kimsey – producer, engineer, mixing
 Jon Astley – orchestral arrangements
 Spencer May – assistant engineer
 Joël Theux – assistant engineer
 Boris Beziat – assistant engineer
 Steve Harrison – assistant engineer
 Chris Fogel – assistant engineer
 David Bailey – photography
 Ryan Art – design

Charts

References

1993 debut albums
Wendy James albums
MCA Records albums
Albums produced by Chris Kimsey
Pop rock albums by English artists